Potecasi Creek is a  long 4th order tributary to the Meherrin River in Hertford County, North Carolina.  This is the only stream of this name in the United States.

Variant names
According to the Geographic Names Information System, it has also been known historically as:
Catawhisky Creek
Meherrin Creek

Course
Potecasi Creek begins at the confluence of Ramsey Creek and Wiccacanee Swamp in Northampton County, North Carolina about 2 miles east of Jackson, and then flows easterly into Hertford County to join the Meherrin River at Parkers Ferry.

Watershed
Potecasi Creek drains  of area, receives about 47.3 in/year of precipitation, has a wetness index of 592.69, and is about 29% forested.

See also
List of rivers of North Carolina

References

Rivers of North Carolina
Rivers of Hertford County, North Carolina